is a passenger railway station located in the city of Ashiya, Hyōgo Prefecture, Japan. It is operated by the private transportation company Hankyu Railway.

Lines

Layout
The station consists of two opposed elevated side platforms serving two tracks. The platform straddles the Ashiya River on the east side and the station building is located on the west bank of the Ashiya River

Platforms

History 
Ashiyagawa Station opened on 16 July 1920.

The station building was reconstructed in 1957.

The station was damaged by the Great Hanshin earthquake in January 1995. Restoration work on the Kobe Line took 7 months to complete.

Station numbering was introduced on 21 December 2013, with Ashiyagawa being designated as station number HK-10.

Passenger statistics
In fiscal 2019, the station was used by an average of 17,805 passengers daily

Surrounding area
Ashiya River (芦屋川)
Ashiya Rock Garden (芦屋ロックガーデン)
Ashiya Shrine (芦屋神社)
Ashiya University (芦屋大学)
Konan Junior and Senior High School (甲南中学校・高等学校)
Kōza-no-taki Waterfall (高座の滝)
Ege-no-yama remains (会下山遺跡)
 TAWARA MUSEUM OF ART (俵美術館)
TEKISUI MUSEUM OF ART (滴翠美術館)

See also
List of railway stations in Japan

References

External links

 Ashiyagawa Station website 

Railway stations in Hyōgo Prefecture
Hankyū Kōbe Main Line
Railway stations in Japan opened in 1920
Ashiya, Hyōgo